Alkaline ceramidase 2 also known as ACER2 is a ceramidase enzyme which in humans is encoded by the ACER2 gene.

Function 

The ACER2/sphingosine pathway plays an important role in regulating integrin β1 subunit (ITGB1) maturation and cell adhesion mediated by β1 integrins.

References

External links

Further reading

Human proteins